GNG may refer to:

Organizations 
 German Naval Group, a consortium of German industrial companies
 National Guard of Georgia, a military structure within the Georgian Armed Forces
 Maine School Administrative District 15, serving Gray and New Gloucester, Maine

Titled works 

 Ginga: Nagareboshi Gin, a 1983 manga
 Ghosts 'n Goblins, a Japanese video game series owned by Capcom

Other uses 
 Gluconeogenesis, a metabolic pathway
 GNG Computers, computer refurbishment company
 Go Nawaz Go, a political slogan in Pakistan
Good Night, Gorilla, children's book by Peggy Rathmann, Caldecott Medal recipient for Officer Buckle and Gloria